Not So Dusty is a 1956 black and white British comedy film directed by Maclean Rogers and starring Bill Owen, Leslie Dwyer and Joy Nichols.

Plot
Two London dustmen (rubbish collectors) Dusty and Nobby, serving the borough of Twickenham spot a couple in an apartment block robbing a book from the woman's sister. The crime is temporarily delayed by the maid. Inexplicably they find a diamond brooch in the bin outside the property. They enter the building to return it just as the owner, Miss Duncan, returns. This allows Dusty to meet Lobelia, the maid. He asks her out to the pictures.

Instead of cash Miss Duncan gives them a book on the philosophy of Diogenes as a reward. This is the same book which the couple were trying to steal. An American is seeking the book offering $5000 (£500).

Meanwhile the book starts to travel. Nobby's son Derek takes it to a bookseller as part of a bundle of old books which needs to be in groups of six. Nobby and Dusty have to break into the bookseller to retrieve it.

This is thought to be a valuable book and they have to thwart the attempts of some criminals to con them out of it. Mrs Lincoln eventually tracks them and gives them £500 for the book. However, it is revealed that the American seeks volume 1 and they have volume 2 which is worthless.

Volume 2 is tracked and they rush to the airport to get the American the copy just in time. He writes a cheque for more money.

Cast
 Bill Owen as "Dusty" Grey
 Joy Nichols as Lobelia, Miss Duncan's maid
 Leslie Dwyer as Nobby Clarke
 Harold Berens as Driver
 Roddy Hughes as J.C. Layton
 Ellen Pollock as Agatha Lincoln
 Bill Shine as Alistair Lincoln
 Wally Patch as Burrows the concierge at Miss Duncan's home
 Dandy Nichols as Mrs. Clarke, Nobby's wife
 William Simons as Derek Clarke
 Totti Truman Taylor as Charlotte Duncan
 Tony Quinn as Elmer J. Cobb
 Diana Chapman as Receptionist
 Scott Sanders as Lancelot Barnaby Pennington the bookseller
 Michael McKeag as 2nd Actor
 Alexis de Galien as Head waiter
 George Roderick as 1st Waiter
 John Moore as 2nd Waiter

Production
The film was made at Twickenham Studios and on location around London. It is a remake of a 1936 film of the same title which had also been directed by Maclean Rogers. Wally Patch, who had written and starred in the earlier film, appears in a small role in the remake.

References

Bibliography
 Chibnall, Steve & McFarlane, Brian. The British 'B' Film. Palgrave MacMillan, 2011.

External links

1956 films
1956 comedy films
British comedy films
Films directed by Maclean Rogers
Films set in London
Remakes of British films
Films shot in London
Films shot at Twickenham Film Studios
1950s English-language films
1950s British films
British black-and-white films